Frew McMillan and Betty Stöve were the defending champions, but lost in the third round to Chris Johnstone and Pam Whytcross.

Kevin Curren and Anne Smith defeated John Lloyd and Wendy Turnbull in the final, 2–6, 6–3, 7–5 to win the mixed doubles tennis title at the 1982 Wimbledon Championships.

Seeds

  Frew McMillan /  Betty Stöve (third round)
  John Austin /  Tracy Austin (first round)
  John Lloyd /  Wendy Turnbull (final)
  Kevin Curren /  Anne Smith (champions)
  Steve Denton /  JoAnne Russell  (quarterfinals)
  Dick Stockton /  Bettina Bunge (quarterfinals)
  Vijay Amritraj /  Virginia Wade (second round)
  Owen Davidson /  Billie Jean King (third round)

Draw

Finals

Top half

Section 1

Section 2

Bottom half

Section 3

Section 4

References

External links

1982 Wimbledon Championships – Doubles draws and results at the International Tennis Federation

X=Mixed Doubles
Wimbledon Championship by year – Mixed doubles